K.V.K. Ninove is a Belgian football club based in the city of Ninove, registered with the Belgian FA under matricule 2373. The full name of the club is Koninklijke Voetbal Klub Ninove (Royal Football Club Ninove) and it has green and black as club colours. The club has played for over three decades at the national level.

History
Already early on in the 20th century, football was organized in Ninove. Around 1908 a city team took part in a local Denderstreek league with teams from neighbouring cities. From 1913 to 1923 the club played under the name Sporting Football Club Ninove, abbreviated as SFC Ninove (with matricule 176). This club dissolved however, with only a few company teams remaining, such as those linked to the factories of Union Allumettière and Fabelta.

Eventually, on 22 March 1936 the current club joined the Belgian FA under the name FC Ninove. Matricule 2373 was awarded and the club chose green and black as club colours, starting in the Belgian Provincial Leagues. Gradually, the club rose through the ranks, reaching the national level for the first time in 1956. That first season, Ninove immediately achieved the fourth place in the Belgian Fourth Division and continued in the following years mostly finishing either just below the top teams or in the middle of the pack. In 1966 however, the club finished second-to-last, dropping back into the provincial leagues, where it remained for several years and during that time the club name was changed to Flemish as VK Ninove.

In 1972, the club relocated closer to Aalst due to construction of a new road, which required leaving complex Den Doorn at the north of Ninove and taking up camp instead at De Kloppers located somewhat more south in Meerbeke. In 1975 the club was able to return to the Belgian Fourth Division, but struggled initially, only returning to the top of the division toward the end of the 1970s, eventually becoming runners-up in 1981 behind Merchtem. That season Merchtem was penalyzed for bribery and forced to relegate, allowing Ninove to be promoted instead, moving for the first time ever into the Belgian Third Division.

VK Ninove was able to maintain well at this level, often ending in the middle of the table, once even second in 1984. Towards the end of the 1980s the club struggled again, narrowly avoiding relegation in 1989 and 1990 but eventually going down in 1991. In the meantime upon its 50th year of existence, the club had changed its name to KVK Ninove, adding the royal designation Koninklijke to its name. This did not help the results however, as the club hovered between the bottom national and top provincial level for many years, dropping in 1993, rising in 1997 and dropping again in 2002. The struggle continued, with the club even dropping to the second provincial level for some seasons, before starting a more successful period from 2013, achieving promotions in 2013, 2015, 2019 and 2020 to end up at its current level, the Belgian Division 2.

References 

Association football clubs established in 1936
Football clubs in Belgium
1936 establishments in Belgium